Riccardo Calafiori (born 19 May 2002) is an Italian professional footballer who plays as a left-back for Swiss Super League club Basel.

Club career
A youth product of Roma, Calafiori signed his first contract with them on 16 June 2018. Calafiori suffered a near career-ending injury to his knee on 2 October 2018. Calafiori made his professional debut with Roma, as well as his Serie A debut, in a 3–1 away win over Juventus on 1 August 2020; during the match, he won a penalty, which was successfully converted by teammate Diego Perotti, and he also scored a goal with a strike from distance following a corner, which was disallowed however, as the ball had previously gone out of play.

The following season, on 3 December 2020, Calafiori was brought on by Roma coach Paulo Fonseca as Leonardo Spinazzola's substitute, and scored his first professional goal in Roma's home win against Young Boys in the UEFA Europa League.

On 14 January 2022, he joined Genoa on loan.

On 30 August 2022, Roma announced Calafiori had joined FC Basel on a permanent deal. Calafiori signed a 3-year contract with Basel. He joined Basel's first team for their 2022–23 season under head coach Alexander Frei. Calafiori played his domestic league debut for his new club in the aeay game in the Cornaredo on 9 October 2022 as Basel were defeated 1–0 by Lugano.

International career 
On 3 September 2021 he made his debut with the Italy U21 squad, playing as a substitute in the qualifying match won 3–0 against Luxembourg.

Personal life 
In October 2020 Calafiori tested positive for COVID-19.

Career statistics

Club

References

External links

 FIGC U15
 FIGC U16
 FIGC U17
 FIGC U19

2002 births
Living people
Footballers from Rome
Italian footballers
Italy youth international footballers
Italy under-21 international footballers
Association football fullbacks
A.S. Roma players
Genoa C.F.C. players
FC Basel players
Serie A players
Italian expatriate footballers
Expatriate footballers in Switzerland
Italian expatriate sportspeople in Switzerland